"Mi Cama Huele a Ti" ("My Bed Smells of You") is the second single by reggaeton artist Tito El Bambino from  his third studio album El Patrón. The song features reggaeton duo, Zion & Lennox. Two remixes were done for the song: the first one being a ballad version of the song solely by Tito el Bambino, the other being a salsa version of the song replacing Tito el Bambino with Charlie Cruz. Mi Cama Huele a Ti received a Latin Billboard Music Award nomination for "Hot Latin Song of the Year, Vocal Event" and also a Lo Nuestro Award nomination for Collaboration of the Year.

Track listing
Official Remixes
Mi Cama Huele a Ti (Version Pop) - 3:54
Mi Cama Huele a Ti (Version Salsa) [Charlie Cruz featuring Zion & Lennox] - 4:35

Charts

Weekly charts

Year-end charts

References

2009 singles
Tito El Bambino songs
Charlie Cruz songs
2009 songs
Zion & Lennox songs
Songs written by Tito El Bambino